Roman Jebavý and Jaroslav Pospíšil were the defending champions, but chose not to compete together. Pospíšil chose to partner with Jan Šátral, but lost in the first round to Kamil Majchrzak and Stéphane Robert. Jebavý chose not to compete.

Seeds

Draw

References
 Main Draw

ATP Challenger Trophy - Doubles
STRABAG Challenger Open